Border Security may refer to:

 Border security, measures taken by governments to enforce their border control policies
Border Security: Australia's Front Line, Australian television show
Border Security: Canada's Front Line, Canadian television show
United States Border Patrol, an American federal law enforcement agency

See also
 Border guard
 Border Patrol (disambiguation)